Antonio "Tony" Cairoli (born 23 September 1985) is an Italian professional motocross racer. He has competed in the Motocross World Championships since 2002. Cairoli is notable for winning nine FIM motocross world championships, second only to ten-time champion Stefan Everts, making him one of the most successful world championship motocross racers in history.

Life and career 
Antoni was born in Patti, Sicily. He began his motocross Grand Prix career in 2002 riding a Yamaha. He was the 2005 FIM world champion in the MX2-GP class. In 2007 he again won the MX2-GP world championship as well as the English supercross championship. Antonio Cairoli  claimed the 2009 MX1-GP FIM Motocross World Championship, and after moving to Red Bull KTM Factory Racing, successfully defended his title in 2010, 2011, 2012, 2013 and MXGP 2014 . Cairoli has won several motos on the Motocross des Nations, particularly in 2012 and 2013 when he managed to win every single moto he raced on. On 5 August 2012, in Czech Republic, he won his 50th GP in World Championship.

Cairoli announced his retirement from motocross on September 14, 2021.

Cairoli announced he is visiting the United States to race the AMA Motocross Championship for the first 2 races of the season, which include Fox Raceway in Pala, California and the Hangtown Classic in Sacramento, California.

He lives with his wife Jill Cox between Rome, Italy and Lommel, Belgium, where he is training.

Achievements

Results by seasons

2004–2006

2007–2009

2010–2012

2013–2015

2016–2018

2019-2021

Injuries 
2008 – Torn Acl (Knee, MXGP of South Africa)
2014 – Knee injury (at MXON Kegums, Latvia)
2015 – Fractured elbow (MXGP of Maggiora, Italy)
2016 – 2 broken ribs, wrist injury
2019 - Shoulder injury

References

External links
 Tony Cairoli at MX1 web site
 Tony Cairoli at KTM web site
 Tony Cairoli at Red Bull web site
 Tony Cairoli, at Gatedrop.com, 11-9-2017
 
 

1985 births
Living people
Sportspeople from the Province of Messina
Italian motocross riders